Wilson Parking is a Hong Kong-based car parking management company. It first opened for business in Perth, Western Australia in 1962, currently operates in Australia, New Zealand, Hong Kong, Singapore, Korea and Mainland China. In Hong Kong, it manages some 400 car parks with 103,000 bays. Wilson Parking in Hong Kong and Mainland China are wholly owned subsidiaries of Sun Hung Kai Properties Limited.

Its head office is in the World Trade Centre (世界貿易中心) in Causeway Bay.

Company overview 
Wilson Parking (Holdings) Limited is a wholly owned subsidiary of the Wilson Group Limited. It was established in Hong Kong in 1983, Wilson Group was acquired by Sun Hung Kai Properties Limited in 1991. Parking schemes include Hourly, Day Park, Night Park, 12-hour Park, 24-hour Park, Max Park, Quarterly and also Reserved and Non-reserved monthly parking.

Portfolio 

The Company covers full parking services in Hong Kong:
 Government
 Quasi-Government
 Housing estates
 Hospitals
 Upscale residential developments
 Airport
 Shopping malls
 Commercial office towers
 Industrial buildings
 Colleges and Universities
 Hotels
 Markets

See also
Wilson Security

References

External links 
 Wilson Parking (Holdings) Limited website
 Wilson Group Limited website
 Sun Hung Kai Properties Limited website

Parking companies
Transport companies of Hong Kong
Transport companies established in 1983